The cook codec is a lossy audio compression codec developed by RealNetworks. It is also known as Cooker, Gecko, RealAudio G2, and RealAudio 8 low bitrate (RA8LBR).

Introduced in 1998, the cook codec was the first audio codec developed by RealNetworks in-house, and was named after its author, Ken Cooke. It is a pure transform codec based on the modified discrete cosine transform with a single block size.

In 2003, RealNetworks introduced a surround sound version of cook, called RealAudio Multichannel.  This was initially designated by the four-character code 'whrl', but is now identified as 'cook', as mono/stereo files are.

Although RealNetworks never published a technical description of the cook codec, others have reverse engineered the format, and as of December 2005, FFmpeg libavcodec contains a decoder capable of playing cook-encoded files. As of July 2009, Rockbox is capable of playing cook-encoded files as well.

See also
RealAudio

Audio codecs